John Alston Hoore Bodden (born 3 October 1981 in La Ceiba, Honduras) is a Honduran goalkeeper who currently plays for C.D. Marathón of the Liga Nacional de Fútbol Profesional de Honduras.

Club career
Bodden made his debut for Deportes Savio in the Liga Nacional de Fútbol de Honduras on a 4-1 defeat against Broncos UNAH on 11 April 2001. He was released by Necaxa before the 2012 Apertura season.

International career
He made his debut for the national side on August 22, 2007 in a friendly against El Salvador and has, as of July 2012, earned 5 caps. He has represented his country at the 2009 UNCAF Nations Cup and was a non-playing squad member at the 2003 and 2009 CONCACAF Gold Cups.

Career statistics

Club

Honours and awards

Club
C.D. Marathón
Liga Profesional de Honduras: 2017–18 C
Honduran Cup: 2017
Honduran Supercup: 2019

References

External links

1981 births
Living people
People from La Ceiba
Association football goalkeepers
Honduran footballers
Honduran expatriate footballers
Honduras international footballers
2003 CONCACAF Gold Cup players
2009 UNCAF Nations Cup players
2009 CONCACAF Gold Cup players
Deportes Savio players
C.D. Victoria players
Sportivo Luqueño players
Expatriate footballers in Paraguay
Liga Nacional de Fútbol Profesional de Honduras players